Nestyukovo is a rural locality (a village) in Dvurechenskoye Rural Settlement, Permsky District, Perm Krai, Russia. The population was 1,077 as of 2010. There are 21 streets.

Geography 
Nestyukovo is located 17 km south of Perm (the district's administrative centre) by road. Lobanovo is the nearest rural locality.

References 

Rural localities in Permsky District